Idol of the Crowds is a 1937 American drama sport film directed by Arthur Lubin and starring John Wayne as an ice hockey player. It was one of a series of non-Westerns Wayne made for Universal. The film was originally called Hell on Ice but the Hays Office requested this be changed.

Plot
The New York Panthers ice hockey team is struggling in the standings. A scouting team headed by Kelly (Hopton) heads to Maine where they've heard of a promising former amateur player. He turns out to be John Hanson (Wayne), now a chicken farmer.

Hanson does not wish to return to the game, but when he learns how much money he can make, he agrees solely so he can make enough to upgrade his farm. His skills make him an instant sensation, but as the team heads toward the championship series, he runs afoul of crooked gamblers and the beautiful woman (Bromley) they tempt him with.

Cast
 John Wayne as Johnny Hanson
 Sheila Bromley as Helen Dale
 Charles Brokaw as Jack Irwin
 Bill Burrud as Bobby
 Jane Johns as Peggy
 Huntley Gordon as Harvey Castle
 Frank Otto as Joe Garber
 Russell Hopton as Kelly
 Hal Neiman as Squat Bates
 Virginia Brissac as Mrs. Dale
 George Lloyd as Spike Regan
 Clem Bevans as Andy Moore
 Wayne Castle as Swifty
 Lloyd Ford as Hank
 Lee Ford as Elmer

Production
The film was announced in April 1937. In May  Universal announced the film as part of its upcoming output.

Filming took place in May. Wayne later said "I'm from Southern California. I've never been on [expletive] skates in my life. I was in the hospital for two [expletive] days after that."

Wayne's biographer Scott Eyman later said "It was a fish-out-of-water experience" for the actor. "Hockey was just something completely alien to him. This was before television, so he'd probably never even seen a hockey game... As for his skating, he basically gets away with it. He's OK as long as he's moving in a straight line."

Reception
The Christian Science Monitor said it had "sufficient excitement".

Lawsuit
Madison Square Gardens sued Universal Pictures over the movie claiming the hockey scenes damaged its reputation, by falsely representing that the violent games in the film took place at the Garden. The suit was unsuccessful.

See also
 John Wayne filmography

References

External links

Idol of the Crowds at BFI
Idol of the Crowds at Letterbox DVD

1937 films
1930s sports drama films
American sports drama films
American black-and-white films
Films directed by Arthur Lubin
1930s English-language films
Universal Pictures films
American ice hockey films
1937 drama films
1930s American films